The streaky-headed seedeater or streaky-headed canary (Crithagra gularis) is a small passerine bird in the finch family. It is an unobtrusive but widespread species in suitable habitats of southern Africa. Its presence in an area is revealed foremost by its callnotes.

Taxonomy

The streaky-headed seedeater was formerly placed in the genus Serinus but phylogenetic analysis using mitochondrial and nuclear DNA sequences found that the genus was polyphyletic. The genus was therefore split and a number of species including the streaky-headed seedeater were moved to the resurrected genus Crithagra.

There are five recognized subspecies, differing mainly in the colour shade of the upperparts and underparts. C. g. humilis of the southwestern Cape has dusky plumage and indistinctly streaked upperparts.

 C. g. benguellensis (Reichenow, 1904) — n Namibia, s Angola
 C. g. endemion (Clancey, 1952) — Lesotho, Eswatini, e South Africa, s Mozambique
 C. g. gularis (Smith, A, 1836) — n South Africa, sw Botswana, s Zimbabwe
 C. g. humilis (Bonaparte, 1850) — s South Africa
 C. g. mendosa (Clancey, 1966) — nw Botswana, Zimbabwe, c Mozambique, s Zambia

Some authorities consider the West African seedeater (Crithagra canicapilla) as a subspecies of the streaky-headed seedeater. C. (g.) elgonensis, an isolated taxon occurring sparsely in the dry, eastern Ugandan woodlands and at Mt Elgon in Kenya, may be conspecific with either the West African seedeater or stripe-breasted seedeater.

Description
The streaky-headed seedeater is 13–14 cm in length. The adult has brown upperparts with some faint streaking and a plain brown rump. The head has a finely white-streaked crown, dark face, and white supercilium and chin. The underparts are warm buff. The sexes are similar, but some females show a little breast streaking. The juvenile has less head streaking, a dull supercilium, more heavily streaked upperparts, and heavy streaking on the pale grey underparts.

Distribution and habitat
Its habitat is open woodland and scrub, including savanna, orchards, and gardens. It builds a compact cup nest in a scrub.

Behaviour
The streaky-headed seedeater is usually seen in pairs, but can be gregarious, forming large flocks, alone or with other canary species. It feeds on soft fruit, weed seeds and buds, and sometimes takes insects. Large flocks can damage sunflower, millet and other cereal crops.

This is an unobtrusive finch, often perching inside bushes.  Its call is a soft tseee, and the song is a  wit-chee-chee-chee-cha cha cha cha chip, interspersed with mimicry of other species. There is also a tweu tweu tirrirrit-tink given in display flight.

References

External links
 Streaky-headed seedeater - Species text in The Atlas of Southern African Birds.

streaky-headed seedeater
Birds of Southern Africa
streaky-headed seedeater